Elizabeth Garvie (born 1957) is an English actress known for her role as Elizabeth Bennet in the 1980 BBC dramatisation of Pride and Prejudice. Her other screen roles include Nancy Rufford in The Good Soldier (1981), Lady Elizabeth Montford in The House of Eliott (1992), Camilla, Duchess of Cornwall in Diana: Her True Story (1993), and Diana Rivers in Jane Eyre (1997). She has guest starred on the television series Alas Smith and Jones, Midsomer Murders, and Miss Marple.

Garvie has spent most of her career working as a stage actress; with notable performances including the roles of Cecily in The Importance of Being Earnest and Sofya in Wild Honey at the Royal National Theatre; Joanna in Sweeney Todd and Natalia in A Month in the Country at The Old Vic; Joy Davidman in Shadowlands in the United Kingdom national tour; Kitty in Charley's Aunt for the Cambridge Theatre; Mrs Manningham in Gaslight at Theatr Clwyd; Paulina Salas in Death and the Maiden at the Watermill Theatre; and  Sheila in A Day in the Death of Joe Egg at the King's Head Theatre.

Personal life and family
Garvie was born in Bristol, and studied drama at the University of Bristol. She was married to the actor Anton Rodgers from 1983 until his death on 1 December 2007. She survives him with their three sons. The couple appeared together in the Thames Television serial Something In Disguise, written and dramatised by Elizabeth Jane Howard.  Garvie is a Trustee of The Actors' Children's Trust, which helps the children of actors.

Filmography

Film

Television

References

External links
 
 An article on Garvie's theatre work

1957 births
Living people
English television actresses
Alumni of the University of Bristol
20th-century English actresses
Actresses from Bristol
English film actresses
English stage actresses